Election Daze is a 1943 Our Gang short comedy film directed by Herbert Glazer. It was the 213th Our Gang short (214th episode, 125th talking short, 126th talking episode, and 45th MGM produced episode) that was released.

Plot
As the incumbent for the presidency of the "One for All and All for One Club," Mickey is so certain he will win that he refuses to campaign. The situation changes radically when Mickey is challenged by political upstart Froggy, who gains popular support with a steady stream of empty promises. But both candidates are in for an unpleasant surprise when Janet Burston appears as a write-in.

Cast

The Gang
 Bobby Blake as Mickey
 Janet Burston as Janet
 Billy Laughlin as Froggy
 Billie Thomas as Buckwheat
 Dickie Hall as Happy

Additional club members
Robert Anderson, Buzz Buckley, Freddie Chapman, Barry Downing, Robert Ferrerro, Giovanna Gubitosi, Jackie Horner, Mickey Laughlin, Valerie Lee, Tommy Tucker, Frank Lester Ward

See also
 Our Gang filmography

References

External links

1943 films
American black-and-white films
Films directed by Herbert Glazer
Metro-Goldwyn-Mayer short films
1943 comedy films
Our Gang films
1943 short films
Films about elections
1940s American films